The Tapirapé indigenous people of Brazil survived the European conquest and subsequent colonization of the country, sustaining most of their culture and customs. Stationed deep into the Amazon rainforest, they had little direct contact with Europeans until around 1910, and even then that contact was sporadic until the 1950s.

The main reports about the Tapirapé were written by anthropologists Herbert Baldus (1899–1970) and Charles Wagley (1913–1991) and by a group called Little Sisters of Jesus, nuns who have been involved with the Tapirapé continuously since 1953.

Origins and distribution
Wagley conjectured that the Tapirapé descend from the Tupinamba, who populated part of the coast of Brazil in 1500, since both tribes speak the same Tupi language. As the conquerors expanded their dominion, the theory goes, some Tupinamba would have fled inland, eventually arriving at a large segment of tropical forest 11 degrees latitude south of the equator, close to affluents of the Amazon river. By 1900, there were five Tapirapé villages with a population of about 1500, extended through a large area between 50 and 51 degrees longitude.

Sporadic contact with European Brazilians started in 1910; they brought iron tools and trade goods. European Brazilians infected them with a host of germs: measles, mumps, and the common cold. American Elizabeth Kilgore Steen spent the night in Tampitawa, one of the five villages, in 1930. She returned with a number of examples of Tapirape material culture, which are housed at the Museum of the American Indian in Washington, D.C. 

The book Brazilian Adventure by Peter Fleming tells of contact in 1932. By 1939, epidemics and skirmishes with neighboring tribes had reduced the population to just 187 individuals in only one village called Tapiitawa; by 1953 there were only 51 left. That year, the Little Sisters started their mission among the Tapirapé, and the Brazilian government established a post of the Indian Protection Service. The population started to recover, and by 1976 there were again about 136 Tapirapé.

Economic system

This and the following sections focus on the Tapirapé as Wagley observed them in 1939. The last section mentions Wagley's observations since that time.

The Tapirapé lived from slash-and-burn horticulture, hunting and fishing. Patches of forest were cleared and then burned to produce fertile soil planted only once or twice before removing another patch. Each Tapirapé loghouse, hosting four or five families related through maternal links, owned its garden; however, agricultural and hunting products could be shared among people from other houses.

There was individual ownership of objects such as tools, hammocks, baskets, strings of beads and so on; however, there were several mechanisms of object distribution. Services such as shamanic cures, midwifing and others were usually paid for with gifts; gifts were also given to repair offenses and in friendship relationships. Further, Wagley describes an annual gift exchange ceremony that served to distribute excess wealth among the less fortunate. In this ceremony, all men in the village had the opportunity to take a sip of "bad kawi", a horribly-tasting drink that produces intense nausea. Powerful, wealthy people usually choose not to taste it, but they have to donate gifts to those who do. People with less wealth usually took a horrid sip to receive gifts.

Social organization

Each family loghouse had a leader; however these leaders were not organized in any sort of village council, and did not elect a village chief.  The log houses were located in an oval formation surrounding the takana - a sort of men's club and home of the six Bird Societies, each named after a species of bird. Men spent part of the day in the takana. Membership on a Bird Society was by parental lineage; thus each such society mixed up people from several loghouses and served as a medium to integrate the population. Bird Societies organized group hunts and sometimes group expeditions to clear gardens. Both men and women belonged to one of a few Feast Groups used for food sharing in the village plaza.

After marriage, men went to live with their wife’s family. Intercourse continued after pregnancy, often by several men besides the husband since it was felt that the child would become stronger with more semen. The Tapirapé were one of few cultures outside modern First World economies where adult men could engage in egalitarian homosexual relationships without one of them taking on a woman's role.

Children enjoyed a great deal of liberty; after boys became adolescents, they could start going to the takana. A coming-of-age ceremony was performed when they became young adults.  The Tapirapé exercised a strong population control policy. No couple could bear more than three children, and not more than two of the same sex. This was implemented by immediate infanticide of any extra newborn babies. The reason they gave for this policy was simply economics: given their technology and means of subsistence, they estimated that no man could support and adequately care for more than three children.

Body aesthetics

The Tapirapé didn't wear any clothing whatsoever in their daily life; however, the men covered with a small cone attached to the prepuce. Women squatted and sat with their legs together. Both women and men painted their bodies with diverse designs according to age and gender. On special ceremonies and dances they would also wear skirts, anklets and wrist bands.

Religion

Their religion was based on shamanism. Shamans could communicate with a variety of spirits, from kind to unfriendly. Spirits were believed to live in the Takana on a cyclic basis; each “belonged” to a particular Bird Society. When one of the spirits was present, two members of the corresponding Bird Society impersonated and attached himself to the spirit by wearing a special mask and other pieces of clothing until their whole body was covered; they then went dancing around the village and received good kawi (a manioc drink) from every loghouse.

Shamans were called in to cure disease. The shaman gulped great quantities of tobacco thus producing a sort of trance state; he then blew smoke on the sick person while performing a massage to make a bad spirit or an object leave the body. If several related people died from disease, a shaman would typically be accused of performing sorcery and was sometimes assassinated by the kin of the deceased relatives. Shamans were also called in to give the spirit to a child about to be born; the shaman dreamed-in the spirit while in trance state. They also purified agricultural and hunting products. Shamans went to Shaman Village after death.

The Tapirapé had a rich mythology. Culture heroes were previous very powerful Shamans that had performed valuable services for humanity.

The Tapirapé from 1940 to 1970

Wagley came back to visit the Tapirapé in 1953, 1957 and then in 1965. He reports on the changes brought to Tapirapé culture as the surrounding Brazilian culture was encroaching on them. Population control by infanticide was a terrible policy in the face of epidemics brought by contact with white conquerors. The Little Sisters were able to end this practice by around 1954. A shaman was killed in 1964 in vengeance for a similar killing that had occurred 20 years before. The assassin was brought to the Brazilian police and spent three months awaiting trial; but after the judge learned of the reason for the murder and considering all the cultural aspects involved, he decided to acquit the murderer and ordered him back to his village.

By 1965, the Tapirapé were concentrated in New Village, created by the Brazilian government to protect them, just a few miles from the nearest trading post; this however increased contact with whites and furthered cultural influence. Loghouses had shrunk in size and some of them had become single-family houses built with mortar. The takana and the Bird Societies still existed, although the takana activities now included manufacturing Indian artifacts for trade. Some women had started to wear skirts and blouses and men had begun to wear shorts at least when receiving visitors or trading goods. Brazilian music in addition to Tapirapé music was beginning to be heard at parties, and alcoholic drinks were starting to be drunk despite strong protests from the Little Sisters and the Indian Protection officers. Although the gift system persisted, some men possessed Brazilian bank notes and had started to understand the value of these pieces of paper.

Some land had been allocated for the exclusive use of the Tapirapé by the Brazilian government; however powerful land companies were already claiming that land. Wagley (p. 125) cites from a speech by a Tapirapé at the First Assembly of Indigenous Chiefs in 1974:

(…) The ranches are surrounding us (…) the land companies are taking away all of our land. Why did the whites want to pacify us? Afterwards, what is it going to happen to us in the middle of whites working for whites that want to take away our land? Is it meant that the Indian should have nothing and to put an end to the Indians? The whites arrived and decided that the Indian could find another place to live. Where should we go? The Indian lives in the place where he knows. If he moves to another place in the riverbanks, in the hills, in the lowlands this is no good.

See also

 Indigenous peoples in Brazil
 List of indigenous peoples

Notes

References
Baldus, Herbert (1970). Tapirapé: tribe Tupí no Brazil central. São Paulo: editora da universidade de São Paulo, companhia editora nacional. 1970. 
Wagley, Charles (1977). Welcome of Tears: The Tapirapé Indians of Central Brazil''. Waveland Press 1983. .

External links
Tapirapé artwork, National Museum of the American Indian

Indigenous peoples in Brazil
Indigenous peoples of the Amazon